Strømme Ridge is a broad ice-covered ridge,  long, trending northwest–southeast between the Muus and Soto Glaciers. The ridge terminates at the north side of Odom Inlet on the east coast of Palmer Land. It was mapped by the United States Geological Survey in 1974 and named by the Advisory Committee on Antarctic Names for Jan A. Strømme,a  Norwegian oceanographer from the University of Bergen, a member of the International Weddell Sea Oceanographic Expeditions, 1968 and 1969.

References

Ridges of Palmer Land